"I Can't" is a song recorded by American rapper Foxy Brown featuring the R&B girl group Total. It was released as the second single from her second studio album Chyna Doll in 1999 by Def Jam.

Single information
"I Can't" was released on March 16, 1999 in the United States. The single was unsuccessful, receiving little airplay on urban radio stations and little video rotation on MTV, though it was slightly more successful on BET. It became her first single to miss the Billboard Hot 100 and peaked on the R&B/Hip-Hop Singles & Track Chart at number 61.

The single featured a sample of the song, "Everything She Wants" by the pop duo Wham!.

Charts

Weekly charts

Release history

References

1999 singles
1999 songs
Foxy Brown (rapper) songs
Total (group) songs
Def Jam Recordings singles
Songs written by Foxy Brown (rapper)
Songs written by George Michael
Songs written by Jay-Z
Music videos directed by Bille Woodruff